Pol Retamal (born 16 March 1999) is a Spanish sprinter finalist in the 200 m at the 2022 European Athletics Championships.

Competition record

National titles
Spanish Athletics Championships
200 metres: 2019, 2022

See also
 List of European under-20 records in athletics

Notes

References

External links
 

1999 births
Living people
Spanish male sprinters
20th-century Spanish people
21st-century Spanish people